Franeker is a railway station located in Franeker, Netherlands. The station was opened on 27 October 1863 and is located on the Harlingen–Nieuweschans railway between Harlingen and Leeuwarden. The train services are operated by Arriva.

Train service
The station is served by the following service(s):
2x per hour local service (stoptrein) Harlingen Haven - Leeuwarden

Bus services

 33 - Franeker - Franeker Station - Tzum - Winsum -  Oosterlittens - Wieuwerd - Bozum - Scharnegoutum - Sneek
 36 - Franeker - Franeker Station - Witmarsum - Bolsward
 75 - Franeker Station - Franeker - Harlingen

Services are run by Arriva.

Gallery

See also
 List of railway stations in Friesland

External links
NS website 
Dutch Public Transport journey planner 

Railway stations in Friesland
Railway stations opened in 1863
Railway stations on the Staatslijn B
Franeker